Robert Joseph Camposecco (born March 9, 1983) known professionally as Bobby Campo, is an American actor. He is known for playing the lead role as Nick O'Bannon in the horror film The Final Destination.

Life and career
Campo was born in Wheeling, West Virginia, and raised in St. Petersburg, Florida. His father, Italian-American Robert Camposecco, works as a painting contractor while his mother, Donna (née Wells), is a make-up artist who has worked for various celebrities. His paternal grandfather, Bob Campo, was a former radio personality in Wheeling and he has a younger sister named Julia Marie who is married to Stephen Christian of the band Anberlin. Campo is an alumnus of Seminole High School and was a student at the Performers Studio Workshop in Tampa, Florida.

In October 2009, he appeared on the cover of Throne Magazine and was also featured in the March 2010 issue of L'Uomo Vogue.

Campo was also featured in several short films including Queen in 2011 wherein he portrayed a handsome, young cabaret doorman who expresses sympathy to a transgender performer and in A Conversation About Cheating with My Time Travelling Future Self in 2012, portraying a man who travels back in time to tell his past self that his life will get better if he cheats on his girlfriend. For his performance in the latter, Amazing Storiess Chris Garcia found his acting "pitch perfect" and added that Campo "does an excellent job playing both sides of the same coin."

In early 2012, Campo was cast for a recurring role in the third season of the supernatural drama TV series Being Human. He plays the character of Max, a young-looking mortician who runs his own business and works extra hard to gain credibility.

He indulges himself in rock climbing, cycling, and soccer and loves listening to music to conduce his creativity, especially when at work. In March 2015, he was cast in the role of  Seth Branson in MTV's slasher television series Scream.

He was most recently seen in Hallmark Channel's films: My Christmas Love in 2016, Sharing Christmas in 2017, and Christmas Camp in 2019.

Personal life
In 2015, Campo married Christie Mac, a hairstylist and former model during a private ceremony in Venice Beach, California.

Filmography

Film

Television

References

External links
 

1983 births
21st-century American male actors
American male film actors
American male television actors
American people of Italian descent
Living people
Male actors from West Virginia
Actors from Wheeling, West Virginia